The 2004 IRL IndyCar Series was dominated by two teams, Andretti Green Racing and Rahal Letterman Racing. While there was great parity in 2003 between Honda and Toyota powered teams, in 2004 Honda began to outshine Toyota bringing their teams Penske Racing and Chip Ganassi Racing down with it, leaving Scott Dixon winless and in 10th place in his attempt to defend his 2003 championship.

Season champion Tony Kanaan set a record by completing all 3,305 possible laps, the first IndyCar driver in modern history to do so.

This season was the last to feature an all oval tracks schedule, which was part of the concept that led to the creation of the Indy Racing League. By 2005, road and street courses started to appear in the schedule by a mainstream scheduling method, and by 2015, there are more races run in road/street courses than in oval tracks.

Changes for 2004
The  engine displacement were used at the first three races of the season but a 3-inch by 12-inch slot was cut into the airbox and engine cover, behind the driver's head. The slot decreased positive airflow to the engine, reducing horsepower as well as reducing overall speeds.

Confirmed entries

Season Summary

Schedule

Race results 

BOLD indicates Superspeedways.
Note: All races ran on Ovals/Speedways.

Race summaries

Toyota Indy 300
This race was held at Homestead-Miami Speedway on February 29. Buddy Rice won the pole.

Top ten results
6- Sam Hornish Jr.
3- Hélio Castroneves
26- Dan Wheldon
12- Tora Takagi
4- Tomas Scheckter
10- Darren Manning
15- Buddy Rice
11- Tony Kanaan
8- Scott Sharp
24- Robbie Buhl

Copper World Indy 200
This race was held at Phoenix International Raceway on March 21. Dan Wheldon won the pole.

Top ten results
11- Tony Kanaan
1- Scott Dixon
26- Dan Wheldon
51- Alex Barron
10- Darren Manning
3- Hélio Castroneves
7- Bryan Herta
12- Tora Takagi
15- Buddy Rice
13- Greg Ray

Indy Japan 300
This race was held at Twin Ring Motegi on April 17. This was Honda's first win in the annual oval race held at their own track. Dan Wheldon won the pole.

Top ten results
26- Dan Wheldon
11- Tony Kanaan
3- Hélio Castroneves
10- Darren Manning
1- Scott Dixon
15- Buddy Rice
27- Dario Franchitti
55- Kosuke Matsuura
8- Scott Sharp
12- Tora Takagi

88th Indianapolis 500
The 88th Indianapolis  race was held at Indianapolis Motor Speedway on May 30. Buddy Rice sat on pole. The race was shortened to 180 laps (450 miles) due to rain.

Top ten results
15- Buddy Rice
11- Tony Kanaan
26- Dan Wheldon
7- Bryan Herta
36- Bruno Junqueira
17- Vítor Meira
5- Adrián Fernández
1- Scott Dixon
3- Hélio Castroneves
16- Roger Yasukawa

Bombardier 500
This race was held at Texas Motor Speedway on June 12. Dario Franchitti won the pole.

Top ten results
11- Tony Kanaan
27- Dario Franchitti
51- Alex Barron
6- Sam Hornish Jr.
5- Adrián Fernández
17- Vítor Meira
13- Greg Ray
10- Darren Manning
24- Felipe Giaffone
12- Tora Takagi

SunTrust Indy Challenge
This race was held at Richmond International Raceway on June 26. Hélio Castroneves won the pole.

Top ten results
26- Dan Wheldon
17- Vítor Meira
3- Hélio Castroneves
7- Bryan Herta
11- Tony Kanaan
15- Buddy Rice
5- Adrián Fernández
1- Scott Dixon
8- Scott Sharp
24- Felipe Giaffone

Argent Mortgage 300
This race was held at Kansas Speedway on July 4. Buddy Rice won the pole.

Top ten results
15- Buddy Rice
17- Vítor Meira
11- Tony Kanaan
27- Dario Franchitti
7- Bryan Herta
5- Adrián Fernández
3- Hélio Castroneves
6- Sam Hornish Jr.
26- Dan Wheldon
51- Alex Barron

Firestone Indy 200
This race was held at Nashville Superspeedway on July 17. Buddy Rice won the pole.

Top ten results
11- Tony Kanaan
6- Sam Hornish Jr.
3- Hélio Castroneves
10- Darren Manning
2- Townsend Bell
15- Buddy Rice
13- Mark Taylor
1- Scott Dixon
55- Kosuke Matsuura
5- Adrián Fernández

Menards A. J. Foyt 225
This race was held at the Milwaukee Mile on July 25. Vítor Meira won the pole.

Top ten results
27- Dario Franchitti
15- Buddy Rice
6- Sam Hornish Jr.
11- Tony Kanaan
17- Vítor Meira
2- Townsend Bell
51- Alex Barron
5- Adrián Fernández
7- Bryan Herta
55- Kosuke Matsuura

Michigan Indy 400
This race was held at Michigan International Speedway on August 1. Tony Kanaan won the pole.

Top ten results
15- Buddy Rice
11- Tony Kanaan
26- Dan Wheldon
6- Sam Hornish Jr.
17- Vítor Meira
7- Bryan Herta
1- Scott Dixon
2- Townsend Bell
8- Scott Sharp
3- Hélio Castroneves

Belterra Casino Indy 300
This race was held at Kentucky Speedway on August 15. Buddy Rice won the pole.

Top ten results
5- Adrián Fernández
15- Buddy Rice
26- Dan Wheldon
55- Kosuke Matsuura
11- Tony Kanaan
27- Dario Franchitti
17- Vítor Meira
52- Ed Carpenter
7- Bryan Herta
10- Darren Manning

Honda Indy 225
This race was held at Pikes Peak International Raceway on August 22. Tony Kanaan won the pole.

Top ten results
27- Dario Franchitti
5- Adrián Fernández
6- Dan Wheldon
10- Darren Manning
11- Tony Kanaan
3- Hélio Castroneves
17- Vítor Meira
20- Jaques Lazier
7- Bryan Herta
51- Alex Barron

Firestone Indy 225
This race was held at Nazareth Speedway on August 29. Hélio Castroneves won the pole. The race was heralded as the series' 100th event. This was also the final IndyCar race at the track which closed down following this race.

Top ten results
26- Dan Wheldon
11- Tony Kanaan
27- Dario Franchitti
15- Buddy Rice
3- Hélio Castroneves
10- Darren Manning
5- Adrián Fernández
7- Bryan Herta
1- Scott Dixon
17- Vítor Meira

Delphi Indy 300
This race was held at Chicagoland Speedway on September 12. Hélio Castroneves won the pole. This race was memorable due to a scary crash involving Buddy Rice with 15 laps remaining as he slid down the backstretch upside down. Adrián Fernández won the race, despite having a broken on-board pneumatic air jack. His pit crew had to use a manual jack to service his car during pit stops, losing several seconds each time.

Top ten results
5- Adrián Fernández 200 laps in 2:09:31.3301
7- Bryan Herta +0.0716
11- Tony Kanaan +0.1239
26- Dan Wheldon +0.2464
17- Vítor Meira +0.4873
6- Sam Hornish Jr. +0.5402
1- Scott Dixon +0.6109
24- Felipe Giaffone +1.1137
8- Scott Sharp +1.1878
3- Hélio Castroneves +1.2595

Toyota Indy 400
This race was held at California Speedway on October 3. Hélio Castroneves won the pole.

Top ten results
5- Adrián Fernández
11- Tony Kanaan
26- Dan Wheldon
6- Sam Hornish Jr.
15- Buddy Rice
27- Dario Franchitti
3- Hélio Castroneves
1- Scott Dixon
2- Townsend Bell
13- Mark Taylor

This was Adrián Fernández's final IndyCar victory.

By finishing in 2nd, Tony Kannan clinched the championship with 1 race remaining.

Chevy 500
This race was held at Texas Motor Speedway on October 17. Hélio Castroneves won the pole.

Top ten results
3- Hélio Castroneves
11- Tony Kanaan
26- Dan Wheldon
17- Vítor Meira
5- Adrián Fernández
1- Scott Dixon
13- Mark Taylor
8- Scott Sharp
2- Townsend Bell
14- A. J. Foyt IV

Final driver standings 

 Ties in points broken by number of wins, followed by number of 2nds, 3rds, etc., and then by number of pole positions, followed by number of times qualified 2nd, etc.

Notes:
  Hélio Castroneves had 15 points deduction at Texas Motor Speedway due to a premature start after the final caution.
  After a red flag for rain at Indianapolis Motor Speedway, Jaques Lazier replaced Robby Gordon, but all points were awarded to Robby Gordon.

References

External links
IndyCar.com – official site
Indianapolis 500 – official site

See also
 2004 Indianapolis 500
 2004 Infiniti Pro Series season
 2004 Champ Car season
 2004 Toyota Atlantic Championship season

Footnotes

Indy Racing League
IndyCar Series seasons
 
IndyCar Series